Pallet is a portable platform used in the transportation of goods.

Pallet may also refer to:
 Pallet inverter, a machine that is used to turn over pallets
 Pallet jack, a tool used to lift and move pallets
 Pallet racking, material handling storage aid system
 Pallet Rack Mover, a device that makes it possible to move pallet racks
 Palletizer, a machine for placing materials onto pallets
 Pallet crafts, art projects using discarded wooden pallets
 Pallet (furniture), a bed that is made of straw or is of a makeshift nature

In horology:
 Pallet fork, an integral component of the lever escapement of a typical mechanical watch
 Pin-pallet escapement, an inexpensive, less accurate version of the lever escapement

Others:
 Pallet, a diminutive of Pale (heraldry)
 Pallet, a GUI for the software MacPorts
Pallet, a case of bottled water (colloquial)
Pallet (shelter), tiny home system by a social benefit company
Pallets Project, organization maintaining several projects in the Python programming language, including Flask and Jinja

See also
 Palette (disambiguation)
 Palate